Elias Wessel (*1978 Bonn, Germany) is a visual artist living and working in New York and Germany.

Education 

 1999–2000 University of Heidelberg; Art History
 2000–2003 University of Mannheim – Faculty for Art and Design; Visual Communication
 2003–2007 University of Art and Design, Offenbach am Main; Fine Art Photography, Theory of Perception, History and Theory of Visual Communication

About 
Elias Wessel is committed to developing photographic concepts and procedures which culminate in abstract images that reflect contemporary discourses within society. The works function as both a contribution to the issues of social and political development and the historical conversation between photography and painting.

Solo exhibitions (selected) 

 Elias Wessel—It’s Complicated, Is Possibly Art. 1014, New York, September 7–23, 2022.
 Elias Wessel – I Don’t Care. I Love my Phone. Kunstsammlung SAP, Walldorf, January 28, 2021 – April 30, 2022.
 Elias Wessel : La somme de mes données. Palais Beauharnais, Paris, January 28–December 28, 2020.
 Elias Wessel: Die Summe meiner Daten – Digitalisierung, Überwachung, Identität [The Sum of My Data. Digitization, Surveillance, Identity]. Kunstverein Speyer, December 2, 2018 – January 13, 2019.
 Werke aus »Die Summe meiner Daten« [Selected Works From ›The Sum of My Data‹]. Internationale Photoszene-Festival Köln, Kunstraum Ruttkowski, Cologne, September 1–30, 2018.
 In The End, Though, Nothing Is Lost. Deutsches Haus at New York University, NYU Arts & Science, New York, April 6–May 26, 2018.
 Sprung in die Zeit [Leap Into Time]. No Cube – Raum für Kunst und Medien, Münster, February 18–March 25, 2018.
 Elias Wessel: Die Summe meiner Daten [The Sum of My Data] – B/W Series. Baustelle Schaustelle, Essen, January 12–February 25, 2018.
 Elias Wessel: History of Touches. Consulate General of the Federal Republic of Germany, New York, November 10–December 15, 2017.
 Die Geschichte vom Vergessenen [The Story of The Forgotton]. Heinrich-Hoffmann Museum, Frankfurt am Main, February 24–July 19, 2017.
 Sprung in die Zeit – Zum Wesen der Bilder [Leap Into Time – On the Essence of Images]. Raum für Kunst und Gegenwart, Ansbach, December 19, 2016 – February 26, 2017.
 Elias Wessel: Stuck Together Pieces! 1014, New York, November 2, 2016 – May 31, 2017.
 Spuren der Wirklichkeit [Traces of Reality]. Goethe-Institut, Frankfurt am Main, August 5–October 5, 2016.
 Landscapes. Künstlerbund Speyer, April 17–26, 2015.
 Elias Wessel: There Must Be More To Life. Art Directors Club, New York, September, 2012.

Group exhibitions (selected) 

 zu mir und zu dir. Franz Jyrch, Maria Sainz Rueda, Elias Wessel; Former Synagogue Walldorf, June 25–July 24, 2022.
 Das Objekt im Fokus [Eyes on the Object.] Karl Blossfeldt, Alfred Ehrhardt, Walker Evans, Candida Höfer, Günther Selichar, Josef Sudek, Michael Wesely, Elias Wessel, Edward Weston, Erwin Wurm and others; SpallArt Collection, Salzburg, August 1, 2020 – May 7, 2022.
 Objects. Stories. Experiences: Extraordinary Things. Assembly Required, Brooklyn, NY, October 2–30, 2021.
 Ich bin ganz von Glas – Marianne Brandt und die gläserne Kunst von heute [I Am All of Glass — Marianne Brandt & the Art of Glass Today.] Sächsisches Industriemuseum Chemnitz, September 28–December 1, 2019.
 Works from the AXA Art Collection – Adolf Luther, Günther Uecker, Elias Wessel. Art Basel, Basel, March 29–31, 2018.
 Photo – BauSchau Projekte 2007–2018. Düsseldorf Photo 2018 at Baustelle Schaustelle, Düsseldorf, February 16–25, 2018.
 Grieger Relaunch. Thomas Demand, Andreas Gursky, Axel Hütte, Thomas Ruff, Thomas Struth, Damien Hirst, Elias Wessel and others; NRW Forum Düsseldorf, November 28–December 4, 2017.
 Doll Parts. Leslie Lohman Museum, New York, May 18, 2017.
 Wiesinger, Stünkel, Wessel: Sichtbarkeiten [Visibilities.] Museum Heylshof and Museum Andreasstift, Worms, August 2–September 27, 2015.
 Freistil – Ein transatlantischer Blick [Freestyle. A Transatlantic Perspective.] Kunstverein Speyer, May 10–June 7, 2015.
 IV International Artists in Residence. Exhibition Hall of the Art Fund, Kursk, September 24–November 24, 2014.
 Being Changed – A Group Exhibition of International Contemporary Art. MoCA – Museum of Contemporary Art, Taipei, March 8–April 14, 2013.
 Sagmeister. Another Show About Promotion and Advertising Material. Sejong Museum of Art, Seoul, September 22–November 25, 2012.
 Art from the Heart. Vanderbuilt Republic, 25CPW, Central Park West, New York, November, 2011

Publications (selected) 

 Robinson, Carl et al. (2022): Painting, Photography, and the Digital: Crossing the Borders of the Mediums. Newcastle upon Tyne: Cambridge Scholars Publishing. 
 Wessel, Elias et al. (2022): Textfetzen. It’s Complicated: Texte aus einem a/sozialen Netzwerk 2019–2021. Ist möglicherweise Kunst [Textfetzen. It’s Complicated: Texts From an Anti/Social Network 2019–2021. Is Possibly Art.] Berlin: Kulturverlag Kadmos. 
 Wessel, Elias / Berg, Stephan / Graser, Jenny (2020): Elias Wessel : La somme de mes données. Embassy of the Federal Republic of Germany Paris (ed.), Berlin-Paris: Phoebe Verlag. .
 Wessel, Elias / Graser, Jenny (2018): EliasWessel. Die Summe meiner Daten – Digitalisierung, Überwachung, Identität [The Sum of My Data. Digitization, Surveillance, Identity.] Kunstverein Speyer e. V. (ed.), New York-Speyer: Phoebe. .
 Wessel, Elias et al. (2018): Landscapes – In the end, though, nothing is lost. Deutsches Haus at New York University, NYU Arts & Science (ed.), New York: Phoebe. .
 Wessel, Elias / Gisbourne, Mark (2017): Elias Wessel. Photographische Arbeiten aus den Jahren 2014–2017 [Photographic Works Between the Years 2014–2017.] 1014 and Consulate General of the Federal Republic of Germany New York (ed.), New York: Phoebe. .
 Wessel, Elias / Oreamuno, Ignacio / Dailey, Meghan (2014): Elias Wessel: There Must Be More To Life. Hamburg: NBVD 2014. .

Essays (selected) 

 Neuberger, Christoph (2022): »The Way Back From the Digital to the Analog: On Elias Wessel’s ›Textfetzen.‹« In: Wessel, Elias et al. (2022): Textfetzen. It’s Complicated: Texte aus einem a/sozialen Netzwerk 2019−2021. Ist möglicherweise Kunst [Textfetzen. It’s Complicated: Texts From an Anti/Social Network 2019–2021. Is Possibly Art.] Berlin: Kulturverlag Kadmos.
 Gelfert, Axel (2022): »The Newsfeed as an Algorithmic Palimpsest.« In: Wessel, Elias et al. (2022): Textfetzen. It’s Complicated: Texte aus einem a/sozialen Netzwerk 2019−2021. Ist möglicherweise Kunst [Textfetzen. It’s Complicated: Texts From an Anti/Social Network 2019–2021. Is Possibly Art.] Berlin: Kulturverlag Kadmos.
 Hermann von, Hans-Christian (2022): »Unsubstantiated Presence – Can Elias Wessel’s ›Textfetzen‹ Be Read?« In: Wessel, Elias et al. (2022): Textfetzen. It’s Complicated: Texte aus einem a/sozialen Netzwerk 2019−2021. Ist möglicherweise Kunst [Textfetzen. It’s Complicated: Texts From an Anti/Social Network 2019–2021. Is Possibly Art.] Berlin: Kulturverlag Kadmos.
 Brenne, Andreas (2021): »Photographs for the Next Society.«  In: Wessel, Elias et al. (2022): Ästhetik des Konflikts. Arbeiten aus den Jahren 2017–2021 [Aesthetics of Conflict. Works 2017–2021.] Dortmund: Kettler Verlag.
 Herschel, Hans-Jürgen (2021): »Variations on ›The Joy in What Remains.‹« In: Wessel, Elias et al. (2022): Ästhetik des Konflikts. Arbeiten aus den Jahren 2017–2021 [Aesthetics of Conflict. Works 2017–2021.] Dortmund: Kettler Verlag.
 Kopplin, Bärbel (2021): »Fotografie als Versuchsanordnung und Denkprozess.«
 Guerin, Frances (2021): »Unsettled in the Interstice: Elias Wessel’s ›Die Summe meiner Daten.‹« In: Robinson, Carl (2022): Painting, Photography, and the Digital: Crossing the Borders of the Mediums. Newcastle: Cambridge Scholars Publishing.
 Wolff, Frank (2020): »Beyond the Digital Promise: Virtual Communities and Democracy in Recent Contemporary History.« In: Wessel, Elias et al. (2022): Ästhetik des Konflikts. Arbeiten aus den Jahren 2017–2021 [Aesthetics of Conflict. Works 2017–2021.] Dortmund: Kettler Verlag.
 Berg, Stephan (2020): »The Trace of the Body« In: Wessel, Elias et al. (2020): Elias Wessel : La somme de mes données. Embassy of the Federal Republic of Germany Paris (ed.), Berlin-Paris: Phoebe Verlag.
 Graser, Jenny (2018): »Abstrakte Realitäten. EliasWessel – ›Die Summe meiner Daten.‹« In: Wessel, Elias / Graser, Jenny (2018): Elias Wessel. Die Summe meiner Daten – Digitalisierung, Überwachung, Identität. Kunstverein Speyer e. V. (ed.), New York-Speyer: Phoebe Verlag.
 Schoen, Christian (2017): »Sprung in die Zeit. Anmerkungen zum Wesen der Bilder.«
 Wolff, Frank (2017): »The soothing power of speed: Elias Wessel’s Landscapes in the cultural history of Russian space perception« In: Wessel, Elias et al. (2018): Landscapes – In the end, though, nothing is lost. Deutsches Haus at New York University, NYU Arts & Science (ed.), New York: Phoebe.
 Gisbourne, Mark (2017): »Visions of Synthesis. The Photography of Elias Wessel.« In: Wessel, Elias / Gisbourne, Mark (2017): Photographische Arbeiten aus den Jahren 2014–2017 [Photographic Works Between the Years 2014–2017.] New York: Phoebe Verlag 2017.
 Graser, Jenny (2015): »The ›Landscapes I-VII‹ (2014) By Elias Wessel – ›In the End,Though, Nothing Is Lost.‹« In: Wessel, Elias et al. (2018): Landscapes – In the end, though, nothing is lost. Deutsches Haus at New York University, NYU Arts & Science (ed.), New York: Phoebe Verlag.

Collections (selected) 

 Kunstsammlung des Deutschen Bundestages, Berlin (2020)
 Kunstsammlung Spallart, Salzburg (2019, 2021)
 Kunstsammlung AXA, Cologne (2015, 2021)

Selected works 

 Textfetzen, 2021–2022
 Deepfakes – Privacy, 2022
 Ereignishorizonte, 2021
 Quick Response, 2021
 Schöne neue Welt – The Moving Images, 2020–2021
 Schöne neue Welt, 2019–2020
 It‘s Complicated, 2019–2021
 Images Through an Algorithmic Lens, 2018–2019
 Die Freude am Rest – Zur Entmaterialisierung der Bilder, 2018
 Die Summe meiner Daten – On Series, 2017
 Die Summe meiner Daten – B/W Series, 2017
 Die Summe meiner Daten – Off Series, 2017
 Hinter den Dingen, 2017
 Jejune, 2016
 Liebst, 2016
 Feral, 2015–2016
 Cityscapes, 2014–2015
 Landscapes, 2014
 Sprung in die Zeit, 2014

References

External links 
 Commons: Elias Wessel – Collection of Images, Installation- and Detail-Views
 Official Homepage of Elias Wessel
Information by 1014 (former Goethe Haus New York) about the exhibition Elias Wessel: Stuck Together Pieces! from November 2. 2016 until Mai 31. 2017, New York
 Press release by the German Consulate General New York regarding the exhibition Elias Wessel: Stuck Together Pieces!. November 2. 2016 until May 31. 2017
 Consulate General of the Federal Republic of Germany in New York, Press release for the exhibition Elias Wessel: History of Touches, November 9. until December 15. 2017
 Literature by and about Elias Wessel, Catalogue of the German National Library

Photographers from North Rhine-Westphalia
German emigrants to the United States
1978 births
Living people
Artists from Bonn